This is a list of flag bearers who have represented Georgia at the Olympics. 
Flag bearers carry the national flag of their country at the opening ceremony of the Olympic Games.

See also
Georgia at the Olympics

References

Georgia (country) at the Olympics
Georgia
Olympic flagbearers
Olympic flag bearers